Blastobasis paludis is a moth in the  family Blastobasidae. It is found in Costa Rica.

The length of the forewings is 5–6.9 mm. The forewings are pale brown intermixed with a few brown, brownish-grey and brownish-yellow scales. The hindwings are translucent pale brown or translucent pale brown, darkening towards the apex.

Etymology
The specific epithet is derived from Latin palus (meaning swamp or marsh).

References

Moths described in 2013
Blastobasis